The Canon EF 100-200mm f/4.5A is an interchangeable telezoom lens for the Canon EOS camera system.

References

EF100-200mm f/4.5A at the Canon Camera Museum

External links

100-200mm